Lieutenant General Yohannes Gebremeskel Tesfamariam was the Head of Mission and Force Commander of the United Nations Interim Security Force for Abyei (UNISFA) from 2013-2014. He was appointed to this position by the United Nations Secretary-General Ban Ki-moon on 12 March 2013. 

His assignment ended on 19 June 2014. Major-General Halefom Ejigu Moges assumed the post of acting Head of Mission, later succeeded by the appointment of Commander Haile Tilahun Gebremariam. Major General Birhanu Jula Gelalcha was appointed Force Commander.

Biography
Born in 1960 in Tigray, Ethiopia, Major General Tesfamariam has a master's degree in peace and security from Addis Ababa University, Ethiopia.

Career
Lieutenant General Tesfamariam has 35 years of experience in the Ethiopian military. His commanding roles include positions as Commander of the Army Corps and the Government of Ethiopia Commissioner for the United Nations Mission in Ethiopia and Eritrea (UNMEE) and Head of the Peacekeeping Department and Head of the Military Intelligence Department in the Ethiopian Ministry of National Defence.

Prior to his appointment as head of mission for UNISFA, he was Deputy Force Commander of UNISFA.

References

1960 births
Ethiopian generals
Living people
United Nations military personnel
Ethiopian officials of the United Nations